Success Story may refer to:

 Success Story (play), a stage play by playwright and screenwriter John Howard Lawson
 "Success Story" (short story), a 1947 short story by P. G. Wodehouse, featuring the character Ukridge
 "The Success Story" (Monkees Episode), the sixth episode of the first series of TV show The Monkees
 "Success Story" (song), a song by The Who appearing on their album The Who By Numbers